King's Walden is a civil parish in the English county of Hertfordshire.  The name includes an apostrophe, but this is often omitted.

The main settlement is now Breachwood Green, and there are also the hamlets of King's Walden, Ley Green, Darleyhall, Lye Hill, Wandon End, Wandon Green and Winch Hill.  At the south of the parish there is Lawrence End Park.

King's Walden settlement 
In 1086, the community of Waldenei contained 53 households, which was considered very large when compared to other Domesday era settlements in the ancient hundred of Hitchin. King's Walden lies in the centre of the parish, near the church, and its population in 2001 was 35.

Breachwood Green
Breachwood Green lies 1 mile south-west of the old village, and its population is 614. Breachwood Green was serenaded by a Hitchin comedian, Paul B. Edwards, in a song making fun of the quiet village. The village has one pub, The Red Lion, which is owned by Greene King. The village has the only school (Breachwood Green JMI) in the parish, which was built in 1859. During the 1970s there was a separate Post Office and Village Stores located in different parts of the village. The Post Office was originally located in Chapel Road next to the Red Lion. This moved a few hundred yards along the road north, near St Mary's Rise. It then moved again in the mid-1970s to the village store on retirement of the village postmistress. The Village Store closed during the 1990s and has become part of a neighbouring car showroom which was formerly the village petrol station. To the north of the village is a partially restored windmill (without sails). Breachwood Green owes it existence to the farming community, as the village was originally a collection of farms, Wheelwrights, Blackmiths and substantial stables. The village also has a large gothic Chapel.

Ley Green
Ley Green lies ½ mile north of the old village, and its population is 86.
The village has a post office and store, it had a small school which is now closed. There is a pub called The Plough. This settlement also existed in 1086.

Darleyhall
Darleyhall lies ½ mile west of Breachwood Green, and its population is 30.

Lye Hill
Lye Hill lies ½ mile south of Breachwood Green, and its population is 33.

Wandon End
Wandon End lies 1 mile west of Breachwood Green.

Wandon Green
Wandon Green lies 1 mile south of Breachwood Green and includes Diamond End.

Winch Hill
Winch Hill lies 1 mile south-west of Breachwood Green. It is made up of several houses and a derelict farm adjacent to Eastern perimeter of London Luton Airport; much of the land here is owned by the Crown Estates.

References

External links 

 History of Breachwood Green in the parish of King's Walden

Villages in Hertfordshire
Civil parishes in Hertfordshire